Hannoversches Straßenbahn-Museum or Hanover Tramway Museum comprises a collection of tramcars from all over Germany, and is located on the site of a former potash mine in Sehnde, southeast of the city of Hanover.

References

External links 

 
Tram Travels: Hanover Tramway Museum

Railway museums in Germany
Transport in Lower Saxony
Museums in Hanover
Tram museums